Laguna Loa Airport  is an airstrip near Laguna Loa in the pampa region of Beni Department in Bolivia.

See also

Transport in Bolivia
List of airports in Bolivia

References

External links 
OpenStreetMap - Laguna Loa Airport
OurAirports - Laguna Loa Airport
FallingRain - Laguna Loa Airport

Airports in Beni Department